"Harukaze" is the twelfth major single (15th overall) released by Japanese pop rock band Scandal. It was released in three versions: two limited editions containing different b-sides, and a regular edition. The title track was used as the fifteenth and final opening theme for the anime Bleach. The single reached #6 on the Oricon weekly chart and charted for six weeks, selling 33,095 copies.

Track listing

References 

2012 singles
Bleach (manga) songs
Scandal (Japanese band) songs
Epic Records singles